Katie Dianne Featherston (born October 20, 1982) is an American actress. She is known for playing Katie in the Paranormal Activity series.

Early life and career
Was born in Texas. She attended Bowie High School in Arlington, Texas and participated in numerous drama activities. She attended college at the Southern Methodist University where she studied acting.
She graduated with a bachelor's degree of fine arts in 2005 and afterwards moved to Los Angeles.

She is best known for portraying Katie in the film Paranormal Activity, which was made in 2007 and released theatrically in the United States in 2009. She reprises her role in the film's sequels, including the spin-off Paranormal Activity: The Marked Ones, where she makes a cameo appearance.

Filmography

Film

Television

References

External links 
 

Actresses from Texas
American film actresses
Living people
Southern Methodist University alumni
American television actresses
21st-century American actresses
1982 births